Puripanda Appala Swamy (1904–1982), also spelled Appalaswamy, was a linguist, writer, translator, journalist and editor.

Early life
He was born in Salur, Vizianagaram district on 13 November 1904. After primary education, he learned Telugu, Sanskrit and many other languages including Oriya, Hindi, Bengali and English.

Life
He actively participated in Indian Freedom Movement particularly Non-cooperative movement, Harijan upliftment and Khadi Prachar movement.  He worked as organizer in All India Charaka Sangham at Visakhapatnam.

He has distinguished skill in the field of journalism. He has worked as associate editor for 'Swasakti', a national newspaper. He used to write articles for 12 years in Andhra Patrika as freelance journalist. He has organized 'Satyavani' magazine with very informative editorials.  He published 'Vaisakhi', a monthly magazine with a praise from literary populace.

The credit of discovering the Mahakavi Sri Sri should go to Puripanda.

He was actively involved in the Library Movement in Andhra Pradesh. He has developed libraries in Sriramavaram, Parvathipuram and established a library in Marakam. He was life member of Andhra Pradesh Library Society.

He was president of Visakha Writers Association and member of Andhra Pradesh Lalit Kala Akademi and Sahitya Akademi. He was awarded Kalaprapoorna by Andhra University in 1973 for his contributions to Indian literature.

Honour
His statue was erected in Visakhapatnam on the beach road. Brief biographic book was written by Dwana Sastry and Bandi Satyanarayana and released on the occasion.

Literary works
 Mahabharatam
 Sridevi Bhagavatam
 Srimadbhagavatam (1979)
 Valmiki Ramayanam
 Oriya Sahitya Caritra
 Historyof Bengali Literature
 Ratna Patakam
 Mohammad Charitra
 Soudamini
 Oriya Songs
 Jagadguru Shankaracharya
 Vishwa Kala Veedhi
 Hangary Viplavam
 Amrutha Santanam (translation)
 Matti Manushulu (translation)

References

Further reading
 Luminaries of 20th Century, Potti Sreeramulu Telugu University, Hyderabad, 2005.
 Telugu tejam Puripanda Appalasvami : jivitam-sahityam: (Puripanda Appalasvami (1904–1982) satajayanti sanvatsara pracurana by Dva. Na Sastri, Visalandhra pablising haus, Hyderabad, 2005.
 Oriya Sahitya Caritra, Potti Sreeramulu Telugu University, 2000. ; 

Telugu writers
Writers from Andhra Pradesh
Indian independence activists from Andhra Pradesh
1904 births
1982 deaths
People from Vizianagaram district
Odia-language writers
Kannada-language writers
Bengali-language writers
Hindi-language writers
English-language writers from India
20th-century Indian linguists